Bico Group (previously Cellink) is a bioconvergence startup that designs and supplies technologies and services to enhance biology research. It focuses on commercializing technologies for life science research as well as bioprinting, and its products often combine capabilities in artificial intelligence, robotics, multiomics, and diagnostics.

Bico Group (then Cellink) began by producing bio-inks and bioprinters for culturing different cell types to enable applications like patient-derived implants.  Bico Group was the first company to provide a standardized bio-ink product for sale over the internet.

The company has ongoing collaborations with organizations including AstraZeneca, MedImmune, MIT and Takara Bio, and its bioprinters are used for research at Harvard University, Merck, Novartis, the U.S. Army, Toyota, Johnson & Johnson and more.

History
Bico Group was founded as Cellink in 2016 by Erik Gatenholm, the company's chief executive, Héctor Martinez, the company's CTO and Gusten Danielsson, the company's CFO. They developed and sold the world's first universally compatible bio-ink to simplify bioprinting for academics and pharmaceutical companies who were, at that time, mixing their own biomaterial in-house. The company released its first bioprinter to test the market in 2015, and continued designing additional bio-inks to support more specialized applications in bioprinting.

Ten months after it was founded, Cellink was listed publicly on the Nasdaq exchange First North. At its IPO, shares were oversubscribed by 1070 percent.

As the company's technology makes it possible to print tissues such as skin, liver, and cartilage, its technology also allows printing fully functional cancer tumors which can be used to develop new cancer treatment. In 2018, Cellink received a $2.5 million grant from the EU to fund its TumorPrint project.

In 2017, the company was described as "a world leader in bioprinting". It established a United States headquarters in Boston the same year.

In January 2018, Cellink announced a collaboration with Ctibiotech to boost 3D bioprinting technology for cancer research.

The company's revenue totaled $4.88 million in 2018. As of February 2019, its products are used by more than 600 labs in more than 50 countries.

In August 2021, Cellink underwent a corporate transformation and changed name to BICO, while keeping the Cellink name for their bioprinting business.

Bico Group acquired German biotechnology company Cytena in August 2019 for a purchase price of $33.8 million.

Bico Group acquired Scienion, a global precision dispensing company, in 2020 for $94.8 million, along with its subsidiary Cellenion.

Bico Group transitioned to a bioconvergence company in 2020, expanding its focus from bioprinting to broader life sciences technology and industrial solutions. The company develops and markets products that enable researchers to culture cells in 3D, perform high-throughput drug screening, and print human tissues and organs for use in medical, pharmaceutical and cosmetic applications.

In May 2021, Bico Group acquired German 3D microfabrication company Nanoscribe for $70.6 million as well as the US-based contract research company Visikol for $7.5 million.

In December 2021, Bico Group acquired the San Diego life-science automaton company Biosero for $165 million.

Products 
The bio-ink produced by the company contains cellulose and alginate, locally sourced from trees in Sweden and seaweed from the Norwegian Sea, respectively.  Cellink's bio-ink technology was developed at Chalmers University.

References

External links
 

Emerging technologies
3D printer companies
Companies based in Massachusetts
Computer companies established in 2016
Manufacturing companies of the United States
2016 establishments in Massachusetts
American companies established in 2016
Swedish companies established in 2016
Manufacturing companies established in 2016